Methoxypropane, or methyl propyl ether, is an ether once used as a general anaesthetic.  It is a clear colorless flammable liquid with a boiling point of 38.8 °C.

Marketed under the trade names Metopryl and Neothyl, methoxypropane was used as an alternative to diethyl ether because of its greater potency.  Its use as an anaesthetic has since been supplanted by modern halogenated ethers which are much less flammable.

References

Dialkyl ethers
General anesthetics
GABAA receptor positive allosteric modulators